The Venezuelan Caribbean consists of the coastal mainland and Caribbean islands.

Coastal Mainland States
 Anzoátegui
 Aragua
 Carabobo
 Delta Amacuro
 Falcón
Paraguaná Peninsula (tied island)
 Miranda
 Monagas
 Sucre
 Vargas
 Yaracuy
 Zulia

Insular Region

Nueva Esparta State
Coche Island
Cubagua Island
Margarita Island

Federal Dependencies 
Aves Island
Blanquilla Island
Los Frailes Islands
Francisco de Miranda Insular Territory
Las Aves Archipelago
La Orchila
Los Roques Archipelago

Los Hermanos Archipelago
Los Monjes Archipelago
Patos Island
La Sola Island
Los Testigos Islands

La Tortuga Island

Geographical regions of Venezuela
Regions of the Caribbean